Mohd Fareez Asmawi (born 17 August 1989) is a Malaysian footballer who is a midfielder recently played for Selangor FA in Malaysian Super League. He also the member of Selangor President Cup's team.

Fareez made his Malaysian League debut as substitution for Muhd Zameer Zainun in 2009 Malaysian Charity Shield against Kedah FA which Selangor won 4-1.

References

1989 births
Living people
Malaysian footballers
Malaysian people of Malay descent
Association football midfielders
Selangor FA players